CIXX-FM is a Canadian radio station, broadcasting at 106.9 FM in London, Ontario. It is licensed as a community-based campus radio station by the Canadian Radio-television and Telecommunications Commission (CRTC), and airs a Rhythmic Top 40 format featuring hip-hop, R&B and dance hits.

CIXX broadcasts at an effective radiated power of 3 kW from Fanshawe College's "M" building, which effectively covers the City of London and some areas outside the city.

The station is operated and programmed by students in Fanshawe College's School of Contemporary Media. Radio Broadcasting students work in on-air announcing, talk programming, writing, production, music programming, sales, and promotions. News stories, full interviews, images, events and contests are all placed on the station's website.

Journalism-Broadcast students operate under the title "XFM News" and provide newscasts for the station. These students work through three different 5-week rotations each semester. They are required to either be a Reporter, Newscaster, or Documentary Producer. On the reporting rotation students are required to attend events and conduct one-on-one interviews to help produce two local stories each day. As a Newscaster each student takes turns broadcasting at the top of the hour mixing local, national, and international stories using Newsroom software. As a Documentary Producer most students produce three 4-minute radio features each week.

When the station was branded as 6XFM during the late 1990s and early 2000s, students of the Radio Broadcasting program from Fanshawe College would rotate as hosts of weekly live-to-air broadcasts from various bars and nightclubs throughout the City of London.

Notes
Fanshawe College also operates three other radio stations:
CFRL Radio 
The Falcon

References

External links
 106.9 the X
 
 

Ixx
Ixx
IXX
Fanshawe College
Radio stations established in 1978
1978 establishments in Ontario